The Salavat Yulayev Cave, also known as the Cave of Salavat Yulayev or Salavat Cave is a cave located in the Ishimbaysky District, Republic of Bashkortostan, Russia, and is seven kilometers from the village of Makarovo. The cave forms part of the Kalim-Uscan rock, which is located under the Sikasya river; it is composed of three distinct levels and is around 35 meters long.
The cave was named after the film Salavat Yulaev as filming was done there, despite a local belief that it was the cave where Bashkir hero Salavat Yulaev hid.

References

Natural monuments of Russia
Caves of Russia
Ishimbaysky District
Landforms of Bashkortostan
Caves used for hiding
Wild caves